Tula is a comune (municipality) in the Province of Sassari in the Italian region Sardinia, located about  north of Cagliari and about  east of Sassari.

Tula borders the following municipalities: Erula, Oschiri, Ozieri, Tempio Pausania.

Tula is known as the birthplace of George Sodder, an Italian-American man who is known for the disappearance of five of his children

Demographic evolution

References

Cities and towns in Sardinia